Nico Nyberg (born September 7, 1993) is a Finnish professional ice hockey player. He is currently an unrestricted free agent who most recently played with Espoo Blues in the Finnish Liiga.

Nyberg made his SM-liiga debut playing with Espoo Blues during the 2012–13 SM-liiga season.

References

External links

1993 births
Living people
Finnish ice hockey forwards
Espoo Blues players
KooKoo players
Sportspeople from Espoo